Kiso Observatory (: Kiso Kansokujo) is an astronomical observatory located at Mt. Ontake in Japan. The observatory was founded in 1974, originally as a branch observatory of the Tokyo Astronomical Observatory, with the express objective of studying extra-galactic astronomical objects. Since 1988, it has been maintained by the Institute of Astronomy, Faculty of Science, University of Tokyo. It is home to the 105 cm Schmidt Telescope. It is currently open for use by astronomers from all over the world.

In 2002, a 30 cm, fully automatic telescope was added with the designation K.3T (Kiso 0.3-meter Telescope). It is mainly used in the observation of variable stars. It has been automated to aid in the making of numerous repeat observations over long periods of time.

References

External links 
 Kiso Observatory
 University of Tokyo

Astronomical observatories in Japan
Minor-planet discovering observatories